Hiwinui is a settlement in Manawatu District, in the Manawatū-Whanganui region in New Zealand's central North Island.

"Hiwinui" means "big ridge" in the Māori language.

History
The Hiwinui area was originally settled by the Rangitāne iwi. Land was purchased by the government in the 1860s and resold to pākehā settlers, who converted the forest to farmland.

Demographics

The population of Hiwinui was 336 in the 2018 New Zealand census, an increase of 93 (38.3%) since the 2013 census, and an increase of 162 (93.1%) since the 2006 census. There were 171 males and 168 females, giving a sex ratio of 1.02 males per female. Ethnicities were 327 people  (97.3%) European/Pākehā, 21 (6.3%) Māori, 6 (1.8%) Pacific peoples, and 3 (0.9%) Asian (totals add to more than 100% since people could identify with multiple ethnicities). Of the total population, 93 people  (27.7%) were under 15 years old, 36 (10.7%) were 15–29, 180 (53.6%) were 30–64, and 33 (9.8%) were over 65.

Taonui

The statistical area of Taonui, which also includes Colyton, had a population of 1,599 at the 2018 New Zealand census, an increase of 162 people (11.3%) since the 2013 census, and an increase of 369 people (30.0%) since the 2006 census. There were 567 households. There were 819 males and 780 females, giving a sex ratio of 1.05 males per female. The median age was 43.2 years (compared with 37.4 years nationally), with 354 people (22.1%) aged under 15 years, 195 (12.2%) aged 15 to 29, 837 (52.3%) aged 30 to 64, and 216 (13.5%) aged 65 or older.

Ethnicities were 95.1% European/Pākehā, 9.0% Māori, 1.7% Pacific peoples, 1.5% Asian, and 1.9% other ethnicities (totals add to more than 100% since people could identify with multiple ethnicities).

The proportion of people born overseas was 11.6%, compared with 27.1% nationally.

Although some people objected to giving their religion, 55.0% had no religion, 35.5% were Christian, 0.4% were Buddhist and 1.7% had other religions.

Of those at least 15 years old, 303 (24.3%) people had a bachelor or higher degree, and 201 (16.1%) people had no formal qualifications. The median income was $41,700, compared with $31,800 nationally. The employment status of those at least 15 was that 741 (59.5%) people were employed full-time, 225 (18.1%) were part-time, and 24 (1.9%) were unemployed.

Education
Hiwinui School is a co-educational state primary school for Year 1 to 8 students.

References

Populated places in Manawatū-Whanganui
Manawatu District